Christian William Hampton Weekes (known as Hampton; 3 September 1880–31 August 1948.) was Archdeacon of the Isle of Wight from 1937 until his death.

Weekes was educated at Charterhouse and Trinity College, Cambridge and ordained in 1907. After a curacy in Hale, Surrey he was Rector of Yaverland from 1909 until 1913. After this he became Vicar of Brading and (in 1934) Rural Dean of East Wight.

Notes

1880 births
People educated at Charterhouse School
Alumni of Trinity College, Cambridge
Archdeacons of the Isle of Wight
1948 deaths